This is a list of religious buildings in Ottawa, the capital city of Canada.

Buddhism
Joyful Land Buddhist Centre
Tu-An Pagoda
White Wind Zen Community

Christianity

Blessed Sacrament Catholic Church
Christ Church Cathedral
Dominion-Chalmers United Church
Notre-Dame Cathedral Basilica
Ste-Anne Catholic Church
St. Anthony of Padua
St. George's Church
St. Joseph
St. Patrick's Basilica
St. Theresa's Catholic Church
Peace Tower Church, Pentecostal Church
St. Charbel Maronite Catholic Parish

Judaism

Temple Israel (Ottawa) (Reform)
Or Haneshamah (Reconstructionist)
Adath Shalom (Ottawa) (Conservative)
Machzikei Hadas, (Modern Orthodox Judaism)
Beit Tikvah of Ottawa (Modern Orthodox Judaism)
Young Israel of Ottawa, (Orthodox)

Hinduism
Hindu Temple of Ottawa-Carleton
 Vishva Shakti Durga Mandir

Islam

 Rhoda Institute for Islamic Spiritual Learning
 Ottawa Mosque
 Abo Ther Mosque
 Al-Batool Fatima Association
 Ahlul-Bayt Centre
 Ahmadiyya Muslim Mosque
 Ahmadiyya Muslim Mosque Kanata
 Assalam Mosque (Ottawa)
 Ottawa Ismaili Mosque
 Bilal Masjid
 Bells Corners Jami Omar
 Islamic Shia Ithna-asheri Association
 South Nepean Muslim Community

Sikhism
Ottawa Sikh Society

See also
List of buildings in Ottawa

 
Places of worship
Religious buildings in Ottawa
Ottawa